The Seven Mountain Mandate, also Seven Mountains Mandate, 7M, or Seven Mountains Dominionism, is a conservative Christian movement within Pentecostal and evangelical Christianity.

History 
The movement is believed by its followers to have begun in 1975 with a purported message from God delivered to evangelicals Loren Cunningham, Bill Bright, and Francis Schaeffer ordering them to invade the "seven spheres" of society. The idea was not seriously considered until 2000 during a meeting between Cunningham and Lance Wallnau. The movement came to prominence after the 2013 publication of Lance Wallnau and Bill Johnson's Invading Babylon: The 7 Mountain Mandate.

The movement was generally supportive of the Presidency of Donald Trump with member Paula White becoming the president's spiritual advisor. White claimed that Trump "will play a critical role in Armageddon as the United States stands alongside Israel in the battle against Islam." In 2020 Charlie Kirk said "finally we have a president that understands the seven mountains of cultural influence" during a speech at the Conservative Political Action Conference.

Theory 
The Seven Mountain Mandate is part of dominionism.

Followers claim that the biblical base for the movement is derived from Revelation 17:1–18, wherein verse 9 reads, "And here is the mind which hath wisdom. The seven heads are seven mountains". The seven areas which the movement believe control society and which they seek to control are family, religion, education, media, entertainment, business, and government. They believe that their mission to take over the world is justified by Isaiah 2:2 "Now it shall come to pass in the latter days that the mountain of the Lord's house shall be established on the top of the mountains."

Followers believe that by fulfilling the Seven Mountain Mandate they can bring about the end times.

Organizations

7M Films
7M Films is a talent management agency.

Followers 
 Miranda Derrick, TikTok dance star 
 Rafael Cruz, pastor and father of Senator Ted Cruz
 Paula White, spiritual advisor to Donald Trump
 Andrew Wommack, evangelical leader
 Lauren Boebert, US House member

Publications

See also 
 Christian nationalism
 Evangelical deconstruction
 Exvangelical
 Moral Majority
 Sociological classifications of religious movements
The Trump Prophecy

References

Further reading
 
 
 
 
 
 
 
 
 
 
 

Christian fundamentalism
Christian nationalism
Dominion theology
Far-right politics
Political movements
Prophecy in Christianity
Religious nationalism